Boricua's State of Mind is an album by Puerto Rican rapper MC Ceja.

Track listing 
"Intro"
"Desnudate" (featuring Wisin & Yandel)
"Se Lamentarán" (featuring Baby Rasta)
"Bounce with This"
"Te Ves Bien"
"Killa' Track" (featuring Artilleria Secreta)
"Danger, Danger"
"No Podran"
"Bellas"
"Mega Mix"
"Impossible Amor"
"Boricua's State of Mind" (featuring Ivy Queen, Gran Omar, Bimbo)
"Mientes"
"Outro"

References 

2001 albums
MC Ceja albums